Facundo Gigena (born 15 September 1994) is an Argentine international rugby union player who plays in the prop position for London Irish in England's Premiership Rugby. He recently played for Leicester Tigers between 2018 and 2021 when he played 45 games.

International career

Gigena represented Argentina at both Under 18 and 19 level before being selected in the Under-20 sides which competed in the World Championships in 2013 and 2014.   He made his senior international debut in a match against Chile in Santiago on June 4, 2016 and marked his first appearance with a try in an 87-12 victory for his side.

Super Rugby Statistics

Leicester Tigers
Gigena signed for Leicester Tigers on 19 January 2018.  He made his debut against Cardiff Blues in the Anglo-Welsh Cup on 27 January 2018. He was released on 8 February 2021.

London Irish
Following his departure from Leicester Tigers he signed for London Irish.

References

1994 births
Living people
Argentine rugby union players
Argentina international rugby union players
Rugby union props
Jaguares (Super Rugby) players
Leicester Tigers players
Sportspeople from Córdoba, Argentina